Thomas John Hughes (9 September 1892 – 6 November 1980), sometimes known as Diver Hughes, was an Australian politician, and a member of the Western Australian Legislative Assembly representing the seat of East Perth for two periods; from 1922 until 1927, and again from 1936 until 1943.

Biography
Hughes was born in South Melbourne, Victoria, to Felix Hughes, a labourer, and his wife Maria (née Boudan). In 1896, the family moved to Western Australia, and he was educated at state schools. He obtained work in the Postmaster General's Office as a telegraph boy, before entering the commonwealth public service as an audit inspector. In his spare time, he rowed for Western Australia in 1914 and 1920.

During this time he joined the Labor Party, and was both president of the Metropolitan Council and a member of the state executive. He was selected to run for the party at a by-election on 18 November 1922 in East Perth, following the resignation of J. J. Simons, and won the seat. Shortly after his election on 20 December 1922, he married Lucy Olive Stone in Inglewood. In 1926, he resigned from the Labor Party and sat from then as an Independent Labor member; however he failed to retain the seat at the 1927 election, losing to railwayman and unionist James Kenneally.

After this, he practiced as an accountant and as secretary of the Mental Nurses' Union. He also gained his bachelor of laws in 1932 and was admitted to the bar in 1936.

Having unsuccessfully contested elections for his old seat in 1930, and for West Province in the legislative council in 1934, he was successful in unseating Kenneally, by this stage a minister in the Collier government. However, it emerged that he had been an undischarged bankrupt at the time of the poll, and was hence ineligible to run, and Kenneally successfully petitioned for the poll to be declared void. A by-election was called for 9 May 1936, and Hughes, who had resolved his status in the interim, won again against Kenneally.

He sat as a member until 1943, before resigning to contest Division of Perth in the 1943 federal election. He was unsuccessful in this, and at the 1945 Fremantle by-election.

He died aged 88 at the Home of Peace in Subiaco, and was buried in the Uniting Church section of Karrakatta Cemetery.

References

1892 births
1980 deaths
Members of the Western Australian Legislative Assembly
Politicians from Melbourne
Burials at Karrakatta Cemetery
Australian Labor Party members of the Parliament of Western Australia
Australian rules footballers from Western Australia
East Fremantle Football Club players
East Perth Football Club players
20th-century Australian politicians